Appomattox Iron Works is a historic iron foundry complex located at Petersburg, Virginia. The complex consists of nine buildings: the machine shop, the mill store, the supply room, the pipe shop, the carpenter's shop and pattern shop, the core room, the foundry building, the blacksmith's shop, and the ruins of a stable. The machine shop at 28 Old Street is the oldest structure in the complex. It was built between 1810 and 1825, and is a three-story, four-bay, Federal style brick building. The Appomattox Iron Works operated at this location from 1899 until 1972.

The complex was designated a Virginia State Landmark and listed on the National Register of Historic Places in 1976. It is located in the Petersburg Old Town Historic District.

References

External links

Historic American Engineering Record in Virginia
Industrial buildings and structures on the National Register of Historic Places in Virginia
Federal architecture in Virginia
Industrial buildings completed in 1815
Buildings and structures in Petersburg, Virginia
National Register of Historic Places in Petersburg, Virginia
Individually listed contributing properties to historic districts on the National Register in Virginia
Ironworks in Virginia
Blacksmith shops